The 1925 Lombard Olive football team was an American football team that represented Lombard College as a member of the Western Interstate Conference (WIC) during the 1925 college football season.

Schedule

References

Lombard
Lombard Olive football seasons
Lombard Olive football